Darkstar: The Interactive Movie is an interactive movie video game written, produced, edited, animated, and directed by J. Allen Williams, owner of the American animation studio Parallax Studio.  It starred the actor Clive Robertson and the original cast of the comedy series Mystery Science Theater 3000 (including Trace Beaulieu, Frank Conniff, Joel Hodgson, Mary Jo Pehl, and J. Elvis Weinstein).  The game also featured animations by the comic book artist Richard Corben and was the final work of the actor Peter Graves, who narrated the game. Darkstar was released online on November 5, 2010 through the company website and as a downloadable through Strategy First.  It was re-released in stores December 9, 2011 in the United Kingdom and Ireland through Lace Mamba Global.

Gameplay
Darkstar differs from the standard game format in that it contains over thirteen hours of live action cinema–far more than any previous full motion video game. Creator and Parallax Studio CEO J. Allen Williams gave a brief description of the project to the website Slightly Deranged saying:

Plot
The player is Captain John O'Neil of the Westwick. You awaken from a cryogenic sleep that has spanned a period of over 300 years.  As a result of the abnormally long hibernation, you have no memory as to who you are, where you are, or why you are there. Beside you are three other sleep chambers. One is empty, the other is occupied by a beautiful woman, and in the final chamber lies the body of a man–300 years dead and missing his left hand.

Your ship is damaged and helplessly adrift in the orbit of the ominous Theta Alpha III.  An unknown crew member has deleted any data that provides an explanation as to why this is.

You know, despite the emptiness and desolation, that someone is in the cold silence waiting for you.

And, as if the day isn't bad enough, the Earth has been destroyed for three centuries.

Cast
Darkstar has roughly thirteen hours of live-action cinema including a cast of all real actors.  It stars Clive Robertson as Westwick Captain John O'Neil.  It also features the entire original cast of Mystery Science Theater 3000 including its creator Joel Hodgson as Scythe Commander Kane Cooper, Trace Beaulieu as Westwick First Officer Ross Perryman, Frank Conniff as both Westwick Navigator Alan Burk and the voice of the quirky robot SIMON (Semi Intelligent Motorized Observation Network), Mary Jo Pehl as both Bridgebuilder Captain Beth Ingram and the voice of the computer Westwick Main, and J. Elvis Weinstein as Galactic Discovery II Captain Cedrick Stone.  Also from MST3K is Beth "Beez" McKeever as the Westwick Pilot Paige Palmer who stars opposite Robertson.  Darkstar was also the final work of the actor Peter Graves.

In addition to Clive Robertson and the Mystery Science Theater 3000 players, the production has a cast of nearly fifty actors, almost all of whom are local to Springfield, Missouri and the surrounding area.

Production
Darkstar was written, produced, animated, edited, and directed by J. Allen Williams over the course of nearly a decade.  Additional animations for Darkstar were contributed by the American illustrator and comic book artist Richard Corben, best known for creating the character of "Den" featured in the 1981 film Heavy Metal and for his comics featured in the magazine of the same name. Other major crew members included the cinematographer Roger Jared, co-producer Mark L. Walters, and electronic media producer Dahlia Clark.

Soundtrack

The soundtrack to Darkstar was composed and performed by Jimmy Pitts (keyboards and pianos), Bill Bruce (guitars and percussion), and J. Allen Williams (bass guitar) under the moniker "Progressive Sound And MetalWorx".  Two other performers include Brent Frazier (guitars) and James Lee Dillard (percussion).  Additional music for was composed by Ruell Chappell, an original member of the Ozark Mountain Daredevils.  Though the soundtrack was originally intended to feature over an hour of music by the rock band Rush, negotiations with Universal Music eventually dissolved and Williams was forced to replace much of the footage with an entirely original score.

The soundtrack was released in tandem with the game and features 38 tracks of music on a 2-disk set.

Reception for the soundtrack has been positive.  In a review of Darkstar at diehardgamefan.com, Alex Lucard rated the soundtrack as "Unparalleled" and wrote, "This is without a doubt one of the  best scores I have heard all year."

Reception
Darkstar received a mixed response from game critics. On the review aggregator Metacritic, the game has a weighted average of 36% indicating "generally unfavorable reviews."

Adventure game reviewers generally praised the game. Drummond Doroski of Adventure Gamers gave it 3 out of 5 stars, writing, "It's not a game for everyone, as some are sure to be turned off by the rarity and simplicity of its puzzles, while others may not relish a return to the infamous days of live actors as their game characters, particularly when some of the acting reminds us why this isn't always a good idea." He concluded, "Darkstar may be light on actual gameplay, but it's rich in cinematic storytelling, and for many science fiction and FMV fans, that's sure to be more than enough."  J. Robinson Wheeler of the adventure game website Brass Lantern similarly described it as "challenging, fun, lovingly and painstakingly rendered and crafted, and worth playing." Alex Lucard of Die Hard Game Fan highly praised the game, giving it a final score of "Very Good Game!" and writing, "When all is said and done, Darkstar is one of the best indie games I have ever played in my thirty years of gaming. It's one of the ten best games I have played in 2010. Most of all, it was well worth the wait and then some. Don't let this thing pass you by simply because it doesn’t have a multi-million dollar ad budget. You've been warned."

Among the wider gaming community, however, reviews were more mixed. The magazine GamesMaster wrote, "Get past the obtuse mechanics and there's a unique retro charm here."  Conversely, GamesTM gave the game 1/10, saying simply "It's not a game."  PC PowerPlay also reviewed it negatively, with their 2/10 review calling it "[a] crime. Send this one to the colonies."

References

External links

2010 video games
Full motion video based games
Interactive movie video games
Mystery Science Theater 3000
MacOS games
Space opera video games
Indie video games
Strategy First games
Video games developed in the United States
Windows games